Brothylus is a genus of beetles in the family Cerambycidae, containing the following species:

 Brothylus conspersus LeConte, 1859
 Brothylus gemmulatus LeConte, 1859

References

Hesperophanini